Al Qahirah may refer to:
 Cairo, the capital of Egypt, known in Arabic as Al Qahirah
 Al Qahirah Governorate, a governorate of Egypt
 Al-Qahirah, Hama, a village in Qalaat al-Madiq Subdistrict, Hama, Syria
 Al-Qahira, Syria or al-Safa, a village in Ziyarah Subdistrict, Hama, Syria
 An ancient name for Mars, the fourth planet from the Sun